The Rivière du Premier Rang (English: First Row River) is a tributary of the west bank of the Jean-Noël River flowing on the north bank of the Saint Lawrence River, in the municipalities of Saint-Hilarion and Les Éboulements, in the MRC of Charlevoix Regional County Municipality, in the administrative region of Capitale-Nationale, in the province of Quebec, in Canada.

The southern part of this small valley is accessible by the chemin du 1er Rang de Saint-Hilarion and the chemin du rang Saint-Nicolas (south side of the river) of Les Éboulements. The upper part is served by Chemin Principal de Saint-Hilarion and chemin des Pins. Forestry is the main economic activity in this valley; recreational tourism, second.

The surface of the Premier Rang river is generally frozen from the beginning of December until the end of March; however, safe traffic on the ice is generally from mid-December to mid-March. The water level of the river varies with the seasons and the precipitation; the spring flood occurs in March or April.

Geography 
The Premier Rang river originates from Lac aux Bois Verts, located on the south side of route 138, in a forest area. This lake has two large islands which divides it in two, forming almost a large U open to the west. This small lake is located at:
  northeast of the village center of Saint-Hilarion;
  north-west of the mouth of the Premier Rang river.
  west of Saint-Irénée town center;
  north-west of Anse de la Grosse Roche on the north-west bank of the St. Lawrence River;
  south-west of La Malbaie town center;
  north of downtown Baie-Saint-Paul.

  to the south by forming a hook towards the west, to a stream (coming from the west);
  to the east by crossing the Principal road, collecting a stream (coming from the southwest) forming a hook towards the north to a stream (coming from the northeast);
  south-east, up to Chemin du Premier Rang;
  to the south, winding greatly at the start of the segment, collecting a stream (coming from the west), curving towards the south-east, then going up towards the north-east by winding in end of segment, to its mouth.

The Premier Rang river flows on the west bank of the Jean-Noël River into a forest area. This mouth is located at:
  east of the village center of Saint-Hilarion;
  south-west of La Malbaie town center;
  north of downtown Baie-Saint-Paul.

Toponymy 
The origin of this toponymy refers to the fact that this river flows largely in the territory of the Premier Rang of Saint-Hilarion.

The toponym "Rivière du Premier Rang" was formalized on March 29, 1989 at the Place Names Bank of the Commission de toponymie du Québec.

Notes and references

Appendices

Related articles 
 Charlevoix Regional County Municipality
 Saint-Hilarion, a municipality
 Les Éboulements, a municipality
 Jean-Noël River
 St. Lawrence River
 List of rivers of Quebec

External links 

Rivers of Capitale-Nationale
Charlevoix Regional County Municipality